Hypocrita is a genus of tiger moths in the family Erebidae. The genus was erected by Jacob Hübner in 1807.

Species

Hypocrita albimacula (Druce, 1897)
Hypocrita aletta (Stoll, [1782])
Hypocrita ambigua (Hering, 1925)
Hypocrita arcaei (Druce, 1884)
Hypocrita bicolora (Sulzer, 1776)
Hypocrita bleuzeni Toulgoët, 1990
Hypocrita caeruleomaculata Toulgoët, 1988
Hypocrita calida (Felder, 1874)
Hypocrita celadon (Cramer, [1777])
Hypocrita celina (Boisduval, 1870)
Hypocrita chalybea (Hering, 1925)
Hypocrita chislon (Druce, 1885)
Hypocrita confluens (Butler, 1872)
Hypocrita crocota (Druce, 1899)
Hypocrita dejanira (Druce, 1895)
Hypocrita drucei (Schaus, 1910)
Hypocrita escuintla (Schaus, 1920)
Hypocrita eulalia (Druce, 1899)
Hypocrita euploeodes (Butler, 1871)
Hypocrita excellens (Walker, 1854)
Hypocrita glauca (Cramer, [1777])
Hypocrita herrona (Butler, 1871)
Hypocrita horaeoides Toulgoët, 1988
Hypocrita hystaspes (Butler, 1871)
Hypocrita joiceyi (Dognin, 1922)
Hypocrita meres (Druce, 1911)
Hypocrita mirabilis Toulgoët, 1988
Hypocrita phanoptoides (Zerny, 1928)
Hypocrita plagifera (C. & R. Felder, 1862)
Hypocrita pylotis (Drury, 1773)
Hypocrita reedia (Schaus, 1910)
Hypocrita rhaetia (Druce, 1895)
Hypocrita rhamses (Dognin, 1923)
Hypocrita rhea (Dognin, 1923)
Hypocrita rubrifascia (Hering, 1925)
Hypocrita rubrimaculata (Hering, 1925)
Hypocrita simulata (Walker, 1866)
Hypocrita simulatrix Toulgoët, 1994
Hypocrita speciosa (Walker, 1866)
Hypocrita strigifera (Hering, 1925)
Hypocrita temperata (Walker, 1856)
Hypocrita toulgoetae (Gibeaux, 1982)
Hypocrita turbida (Hering, 1925)
Hypocrita variabilis (Zerny, 1928)
Hypocrita wingerteri Vincent, 2004

Former species
Hypocrita phoenicides (Druce, 1884)

References

 ;  2010: "Annotated check list of the Noctuoidea (Insecta, Lepidoptera) of North America north of Mexico". ZooKeys. 40: 1–239. 
 , 2004: "Description d'une nouvelle Arctiidae d'Amérique latine, et contribution à la révision du genre Hypocrita Hübner, [1807] (Lepidoptera, Arctiidae, Pericopinae)". Lépidoptères, 2 (2): 21–26.

External links

 
Pericopina
Moth genera